Alias the Lone Wolf is a 1927 silent mystery film directed by Edward H. Griffith. The film is based on the 1921 novel of the same name by Louis Joseph Vance. It is not known whether the film currently survives.

Cast
Bert Lytell as Michael Lanyard
Lois Wilson as Eve de Montalais
William V. Mong as Whitaker Monk
Ned Sparks as Phinuit
James Mason as Popinot
Paulette Duval as Liane Delorme
Ann Brody as Fifi
Alphonse Ethier as Inspector Crane

References

External links

1927 films
American silent feature films
American black-and-white films
1927 mystery films
American mystery films
Films directed by Edward H. Griffith
Columbia Pictures films
1920s American films
Silent mystery films